Royal AM (also known as "Thwihli Thwahla") is a South African football club based in Durban, KwaZulu Natal that plays in the PSL. They play in DSTV Premiership after purchasing a license from Bloemfontein Celtic in August 2021 by Durban business woman Shauwn Mkhize & her son Andile Mpisane.

Current squad

Honours 

SAFA Second Division Kwazulu Natal Stream: 2015–16
Macufe Cup 
Winners: 2022

Notes

References 

Soccer clubs in South Africa
National First Division clubs